Warren Maher (born 15 January 1957) is a former professional tennis player from Australia.
After leaving the professional tour, Warren was appointed Head Coach for Donvale Tennis Club (Donvale TC) in his native Melbourne in 1983. In the decade following, he discovered and coached a number of highly talented and successful junior players. Warren played No. 1 and captained Donvale's "A" grade state pennant team (now known as "State Grade") which won a number of titles. Team members included Noel Phillips, Ian Russell, Ron Woodbridge, Dean Ashton, Graeme Harris.

After a successful decade with Donvale TC, Warren and wife Kerry formed a business and took-over coaching and management of a large council-owned tennis facility known as Camberwell Tennis Centre (now Booroondara).

Junior
Maher had a promising junior career, with the highlight coming at the 1975 Australian Open, where he and Glenn Busby won the boys' doubles title.

Grand Slams
Maher made the third round of the 1979 Australian Open and in the opening round had a win over seventh seed Tim Wilkison. He had also beaten Wilkison in Adelaide two weeks before. In the second round, he defeated Shlomo Glickstein, 10–8 in the final set, before losing in the third round to Mark Edmondson. He also reached the third round of the 1982 Australian Open, beating Mike Barr and Tom Cain.

Challenger titles

Doubles: (2)

References

1957 births
Living people
Australian male tennis players
Australian Open (tennis) junior champions
Tennis players from Melbourne
Grand Slam (tennis) champions in boys' doubles
People from Kew, Victoria
Australian tennis coaches